Scientific socialism is a term which was coined in 1840 by Pierre-Joseph Proudhon in his book What is Property? to mean a society ruled by a scientific government, i.e., one whose sovereignty rests upon reason, rather than sheer will: Thus, in a given society, the authority of man over man is inversely proportional to the stage of intellectual development which that society has reached; and the probable duration of that authority can be calculated from the more or less general desire for a true government, — that is, for a scientific government. And just as the right of force and the right of artifice retreat before the steady advance of justice, and must finally be extinguished in equality, so the sovereignty of the will yields to the sovereignty of the reason, and must at last be lost in scientific socialism.

In the 1844 book The Holy Family, Karl Marx and Friedrich Engels described the writings of the socialist, communist writers Théodore Dézamy and Jules Gay as truly "scientific". Later in 1880, Engels used the term "scientific socialism" to describe Marx's social-political-economic theory.

Although the term socialism has come to mean specifically a combination of political and economic science, it is also applicable to a broader area of science encompassing what is now considered sociology and the humanities. The distinction between Utopian and scientific socialism originated with Marx, who criticized the Utopian characteristics of French socialism and English and Scottish political economy. Engels later argued that Utopian socialists failed to recognize why it was that socialism arose in the historical context that it did, that it arose as a response to new social contradictions of a new mode of production, i.e. capitalism. In recognizing the nature of socialism as the resolution of this contradiction and applying a thorough scientific understanding of capitalism, Engels asserted that socialism had broken free from a primitive state and become a science. This shift in socialism was seen as complementary to shifts in contemporary biology sparked by Charles Darwin and the understanding of evolution by natural selection—Marx and Engels saw this new understanding of biology as essential to the new understanding of socialism and vice versa.

History 
In Bangladesh after 1971, Jatiya Samajtantrik Dal was formed with an aim to exercise rule based on scientific socialism.

Methodology 
Scientific socialism refers to a method for understanding and predicting social, economic and material phenomena by examining their historical trends through the use of the scientific method in order to derive probable outcomes and probable future developments. It is in contrast to what later socialists referred to as utopian socialism—a method based on establishing seemingly rational propositions for organizing society and convincing others of their rationality and/or desirability. It also contrasts with classical liberal notions of natural law, which are grounded in metaphysical notions of morality rather than a dynamic materialist or physicalist conception of the world.

Scientific socialists view social and political developments as being largely determined by economic conditions, in contrast to the ideas of Utopian socialists and classical liberals, and thus believe that social relations and notions of morality are context-based relative to their specific stage of economic development. They believe that as economic systems, socialism and capitalism are not social constructs that can be established at any time based on the subjective will and desires of the population, but instead are the products of social evolution. An example of this was the advent of agriculture which enabled human communities to produce a surplus—this change in material and economic development led to a change in the social relations and rendered the old form of social organization based on subsistence-living obsolete and a hindrance to further material progress. The changing economic conditions necessitated a change in social organization.

See also 
 Anti-Duhring

 Social science, one of the branches of science, devoted to the study of societies and the relationships among individuals within those societies.
 Socialism with Chinese characteristics, the official ideology of the Chinese Communist Party
 Scientific Outlook on Development, a socio-economic concept of the Chinese Communist Party
 Scientific communism, the Soviet Union curriculum requirements for understanding Soviet orthodoxy on the subject.
 Science and technology in the Soviet Union
 Siad Barre, who called his mixture of Marxism-Leninism and Islam "scientific socialism".
 Socialism: Utopian and Scientific
 Socialist mode of production

References 

Marxist theory
Political theories
Scientific theories
Types of socialism